Cămărzana is a commune of 2,304 inhabitants situated in Satu Mare County, Romania. It is composed of a single village, Cămărzana.

The commune is located in the northern part of the county, on the border with Ukraine.

References

Communes in Satu Mare County